This is a list of the 21 members of the European Parliament for the Czech Republic in the 2019 to 2024 session.

These MEPs were elected at the 2019 European Parliament election in the Czech Republic.

List 

On the ANO list: (Renew)
Dita Charanzová
Martina Dlabajová
Martin Hlaváček
Radka Maxová
Ondřej Knotek
Ondřej Kovařík

On the Civic Democratic Party list: (ECR)
Jan Zahradil
Alexandr Vondra
Evžen Tošenovský
Veronika Vrecionová

On the Czech Pirate Party list: (Greens-EFA)
Marcel Kolaja
Markéta Gregorová
Mikuláš Peksa

On the TOP 09–Mayors and Independents list: (EPP Group)
Luděk Niedermayer
Jiří Pospíšil
Stanislav Polčák (STAN)

On the Freedom and Direct Democracy list: (ID)
Hynek Blaško
Ivan David

On the Christian and Democratic Union - Czechoslovak People's Party list: (EPP Group)
Tomáš Zdechovský
Michaela Šojdrová

On the Communist Party of Bohemia and Moravia list: (GUE–NGL)
Kateřina Konečná

References

See also 

 List of members of the European Parliament, 2019–2024

2019
Lists of Members of the European Parliament 2019–2024
MEPs for the Czech Republic 2019–2024